German submarine U-589 was a Type VIIC U-boat of Nazi Germany's Kriegsmarine during World War II.

The boat was sunk by depth charges from a British warship assisted by a British aircraft on 14 September 1942.

Design
German Type VIIC submarines were preceded by the shorter Type VIIB submarines. U-589 had a displacement of  when at the surface and  while submerged. She had two shafts and two  propellers.

U-589 was fitted with five  torpedo tubes (four fitted at the bow and one at the stern), fourteen torpedoes, one  SK C/35 naval gun, 220 rounds, and a  C/30 anti-aircraft gun. The boat had a complement of between forty-four and sixty.

Service history
The submarine was laid down on 31 October 1940 at Blohm & Voss, Hamburg as yard number 565, launched on 6 August 1941 and commissioned on 25 September under the command of Korvettenkapitän Hans-Joachim Horrer.

She served with the 6th U-boat Flotilla from 26 June 1941 for training and stayed with that organization for operations from 1 February 1942. She was reassigned to the 11th flotilla on 1 July.

First and second patrols
U-589s first patrol was preceded by a short trip from Kiel to the German-controlled island of Helgoland, (also known as Heligoland), in February 1942. The patrol itself commenced on the 28th. She steamed through the Norwegian Sea and arrived at Kirkenes in the far north of Norway on 21 March.

On her second patrol she fired four torpedoes at the minesweeper  but the tracks were seen and evasive action was carried out. An unsuccessful depth charge attack followed which caused no damage to the U-boat.

Third patrol
She left Kirkenes on 8 April 1942 and covered the Barents Sea. She returned to her start point on the 20th.

Fourth patrol
U-589 damaged the Soviet merchant vessel Tsiolkovskij on 1 May 1942. This ship was later sunk by the German destroyers Z-24 and Z-25.

Fifth patrol
After more short voyages from Kirkenes to Skjomenfjord (south of Narvik), then Narvik itself and Bergen in May 1942, she carried out a relatively uneventful patrol which culminated in her arrival at Skjomenfjord on 12 August.

Sixth patrol
The boat set out for her sixth sortie on 23 August 1942. She travelled as far east as Nova Zemlya and returned to Narvik on 1 September.

Seventh patrol and loss
U-589 set out from Narvik on 9 September 1942.

Forty-four men died with U-589; there were no survivors.

Alternate account of loss

Wolfpacks
U-589 took part in ten wolfpacks, namely:
 Aufnahme (9 – 11 March 1942) 
 Blücher (11 – 18 March 1942) 
 Eiswolf (28 – 31 March 1942) 
 Bums (8 – 10 April 1942) 
 Robbenschlag (10 – 14 April 1942) 
 Blutrausch (15 – 19 April 1942) 
 Strauchritter (29 April – 5 May 1942) 
 Greif (16 – 22 May 1942) 
 Nebelkönig (27 July – 11 August 1942) 
 Trägertod (12 – 14 September 1942)

Summary of raiding history

References

Bibliography

External links

German Type VIIC submarines
U-boats commissioned in 1941
U-boats sunk in 1942
U-boats sunk by depth charges
U-boats sunk by British warships
1941 ships
Ships built in Hamburg
Ships lost with all hands
World War II submarines of Germany
World War II shipwrecks in the Arctic Ocean
Maritime incidents in September 1942